Kreuzberg is a district of Berlin, Germany. It is part of the Friedrichshain-Kreuzberg borough located south of Mitte. During the Cold War era, it was one of the poorest areas of West Berlin, but since German reunification in 1990, it has become more gentrified and is known for its arts scene.

The borough is known for its large percentage of immigrants and descendants of immigrants, many of whom are of Turkish ancestry. As of 2006, 31.6% of Kreuzberg's inhabitants did not have German citizenship. Kreuzberg is noted for its diverse cultural life and experimental alternative lifestyles, and is an attractive area for many; however, some parts of the district are still characterized by higher levels of unemployment.

The counterculture tradition of Kreuzberg led to a plurality of votes for the Green Party, which is unique among all Berlin boroughs.

Geography

Layout
Kreuzberg is bounded by the river Spree in the east. The Landwehrkanal flows through Kreuzberg from east to west, with the Paul-Lincke-Ufer street running alongside it. Other characteristics are the old U-Bahn line of the present-day U1, Görlitzer Park in SO 36, and Viktoriapark on the slope of Kreuzberg hill in SW 61.

Subdivision
Kreuzberg is divided into 2 zones (Ortslagen):
Östliches Kreuzberg (Berlin SO 36)
Westliches Kreuzberg (Kreuzberg 61)

History 
In contrast to many other areas of Berlin, which were villages before their integration into Berlin, Kreuzberg has a rather short history. It was formed on 1 October 1920 by the Greater Berlin Act, which provided for the incorporation of suburbs and the reorganisation of Berlin into twenty boroughs. The eastern Friedrichsvorstadt, the southern Friedrichstadt, the western and southern Luisenstadt, and the Tempelhofer Vorstadt were merged into the new sixth borough of Berlin, first named Hallesches Tor. On 27 September 1921, the borough assembly of Hallesches Tor decided to rename the borough after the homonymous hill. The hill is traditionally a place for weekend trips. It received its name from the 1821 Prussian National Monument for the Liberation Wars by Karl Friedrich Schinkel within the Viktoriapark, built in commemoration of the Napoleonic Wars. Except for its northernmost part—the quarter Friedrichstadt (established at the end of the 17th century)—today's Kreuzberg was a very rural place until well into the 19th century.

This changed when, in the 1860s, industrialization caused Berlin to grow rapidly. This called for extensive housing—much of which was built exploiting the dire needs of the poor, with widespread land speculation. Many of Kreuzberg's buildings originate from that time. They were built on the streets laid out in the Hobrecht-Plan in an area that came to be known architecturally as the Wilhelmine Ring.

Far into the 20th century, Kreuzberg was the most populous of Berlin's boroughs even in absolute numbers, with more than 400,000 people, although it was and still is geographically the smallest. As a result, with more than 60,000 people per square kilometer (155,000 people per square mile), Kreuzberg had the highest population density in Berlin.

Kreuzberg became a district of migration during the late-19th century when Berlin began growing rapidly as an economic and cultural hub. Before World War II, it was home to a diverse population, with a large portion of the population being Ashkenazi Jews. Central to Kreuzberg Jewish life was the Fraenkelufer Synagogue, with a capacity of 2,000. This synagogue was destroyed during Kristallnacht, as were numerous Jewish businesses and property. The vast majority of Kreuzberg's Jews were deported to their deaths between 1942 and 1944 by the Nazis during The Holocaust, and their houses and businesses were seized and given to ethnic Germans. The Jewish Museum Berlin stands in Kreuzberg, and many Stolpersteine can be seen on Kreuzberg streets, commemorating the murdered Jews who lived in the area.  
 

In addition to housing, Kreuzberg was also an industrial center of Berlin. The "export quarter" along Ritter Street consisted of many profitable small businesses, and the "press quarter" along Koch Street (Friedrichstadt) was the home of most of Germany's large newspapers, as well as the Ullstein, Scherl, and Mosse book publishers.

Both industrial quarters were almost entirely destroyed by air raids during World War II, with the American bombing by over a thousand aircraft on 3 February 1945. In remembrance of the old tradition, the Axel Springer press company erected its German headquarters at Kochstraße again, right next to the Berlin Wall.

In July 1945, most of the then district was assigned to the American Sector. The most important transition to East Berlin was Checkpoint Charlie after the Berlin Wall was built.

After World War II, Kreuzberg's housing rents were regulated by law which made investments unattractive. As a result, housing was of low quality, but cheap, which made the borough a prime target for immigrants. 
Starting in the late 1960s, increasing numbers of students, artists, and immigrants began moving to Kreuzberg. Enclosed by the Berlin Wall on three sides, the area became famous for its alternative lifestyle and its squatters, especially the SO 36 part of Kreuzberg. Starting in 1987, there have been violent riots in SO 36 on Labour day.

After the fall of the Berlin Wall, Kreuzberg suddenly found itself in the middle of the city again. The initially cheap rents and high degree of 19th century housing made some parts of the borough more attractive as a residential area for a much wider (and richer) variety of people. Today, Kreuzberg has one of the youngest populations of all European city boroughs; statistically, its population has been completely swapped twice in the last two decades.

Berlin's 2001 administrative reform combined Kreuzberg with Friedrichshain to form the new borough of Friedrichshain-Kreuzberg. Since the two areas are linked only by a single bridge over the Spree River, the Oberbaumbrücke,  The two areas not being able to agree on a common location for the future borough's city hall, the present location in Friedrichshain was decided by flipping a five-Mark coin.

Culture 
Kreuzberg has historically been home to Berlin's punk rock movement as well as other alternative subcultures in Germany. The SO36 club remains a fixture on the Berlin music scene. It was originally focused on punk music and in the 1970s was often frequented by Iggy Pop and David Bowie. In those days, the club rivalled New York's CBGB as one of the finest new-wave venues in the world.

There has also been a significant influence stemming from African-American and hip hop culture on Kreuzberg's youth and the area has become a centre for rap and breakdance within Berlin. Though the majority of Kreuzberg's residents are of German or Turkish descent, some identify more with American or African-American culture.
Hip hop was largely introduced to the youth of Kreuzberg by the children of American servicemen who were stationed nearby until the reunification of Germany.

The Carnival of Cultures, a large annual festival, celebrates different cultures and heritages with colourful street parades and festivities including street entertainment, food, arts and craft stalls, music, and art.

Kreuzberg has long been the epicenter of LGBTQ life and arts in Berlin. Kreuzberg is home to the Schwules Museum, established in the 1980s and dedicated to preserving, exhibiting, and discovering queer history, art, and culture.

Kreuzberg in popular culture 

 German musician and DJ Robin Schulz's musical composition, "Prayer in C", an adaptation of a prior song of the same name by Lilly Wood & the Prick, had most of the music video filmed in Friedrichshain-Kreuzberg.
 Turkish-German filmmaker Neco Celik, who portrays the American influence over the youth culture in Kreuzberg in his first film, Alltag, notes that "Kreuzberg is a kind of biotope where different nationalities live, but the environment determines their lives, not their nationalities".
 German musician Sven Regener's first novel, Berlin Blues, and third novel, are set in the district of Kreuzberg.
 "Kreuzberg" is a song by English indie rock band Bloc Party on the album A Weekend in the City, which also mentions the East Side Gallery.
 American musician Stephen Malkmus mentions taking a "locomotive to Kreuzberg" in his song "Black Book".
 Kreuzberg's bohemian way of life is reflected in the song "Find the Time" by English singer/songwriter Sam Duckworth's band Get Cape. Wear Cape. Fly on the album Searching for the Hows and Whys.
 Kreuzberg-based Turkish-German rapper Killa Hakan mentions Kreuzberg in most of his songs, most notably in his 2007 single "Kreuzberg City".
 The acclaimed documentary Pool of Princesses (Prinzessinnenbad) by  focuses on the lives of three young girls from Kreuzberg.
 Canadian musician Shotgun Jimmie's 2011 album Transistor Sister contains a song titled "The King of Kreuzberg", wherein he sings about taking the train to Kreuzberg and "jump[ing] right into it".
 English post-punk band Killing Joke have a song on their first album titled "SO 36".
 Phoenix folk-punk band Andrew Jackson Jihad make a reference to Kreuzberg in the song "Kokopelli Face Tattoo" with the lyric "Kreuz is German for Williams." Vocalist Sean Bonnette claims this pokes fun at the young hipness of Kreuzberg, in that it is similar to a German version of Williamsburg, Brooklyn.
 Kreuzberg appears in Shadowrun Returnss Dragonfall expansion as Kreuzbasar, a small self-sufficient walled community in the anarchic "F-State" of Berlin.
In the novel No Man's Land by Michael Califra (Hadrian, 2015), the story's narrator, an American expatriate named Richard, lives in the Kreuzberg district of West Berlin in the months prior to the fall of the Wall.
 Kreuzberg based Turkish-German rapper Massaka mentions Kreuzberg as a "ghetto" in his songs.

Places and buildings of interest

 Anhalter Bahnhof (station)
 Böckler Park
 Checkpoint Charlie
 Checkpoint Charlie Museum
 Engelbecken
 Peter Fechter Memorial, one of the first fatalities of the Berlin Wall
 Federal Ministry of Economic Cooperation and Development (Germany)
 Friedrichstraße
 German Museum of Technology (Berlin)
 Gleisdreieck (Berlin U-Bahn)
 Görlitzer Bahnhof (station)
 Hermannplatz (Berlin U-Bahn)
 Hotel Excelsior
 Jerusalem Church
 Jewish Museum Berlin
 Kochstrasse (Berlin U-Bahn)
 Kottbusser Tor (Berlin U-Bahn)
 Kreuzberg (Tempelhofer Berge)
 Landwehr Canal
 Luisenstadt Canal
 Martin-Gropius-Bau
 Mehringdamm (Berlin U-Bahn)
 Mehringplatz
 Moritzplatz (Berlin U-Bahn)
 National Monument for the Liberation Wars
 Niederkirchnerstraße
 Oberbaumbrücke (bridge over the Spree)
 Platz der Luftbrücke (Berlin U-Bahn)
 Prinzenstrasse (Berlin U-Bahn)
 Saint Thomas Church (Berlin)
 Schlesisches Tor (Berlin U-Bahn)
 Schönleinstraße (Berlin U-Bahn)
 SO36 quarter
 Tabor Church
 Topography of Terror
 U1 (Berlin Underground line)
 Viktoriapark
 Wilhelmstrasse

People 
 Peter Frankenfeld (1913-1979), German comedian, radio and television personality.
 Gabor Steingart (born 1962), German journalist
 Benno Fürmann (born 1972), German actor

See also
 Berlin-Friedrichshain-Kreuzberg – Prenzlauer Berg East (electoral constituency)

References

External links

 friedrichshain-kreuzberg.de, the website of the combined borough 
 Carnival of Cultures 

Entertainment districts in Germany
Former boroughs of Berlin
Localities of Berlin